Catalan Republic or Catalan State refers to Catalonia at various times when it was proclaimed either an independent republic or as a republic within a Spanish federal republic:
 Catalan Republic (1641), a proclaimed independent state under French protection, but shortly thereafter incorporated into the Kingdom of France.
 Catalan State (1873), a proclaimed state within the First Spanish Republic.
 Catalan Republic (1931), a proclaimed state declared in anticipation of the imminent formation of a Spanish republic. Within days, this territory voluntarily became an autonomous area within the Second Spanish Republic.
 Catalan State (1934), a "Catalan State within the Spanish Federal Republic" proclaimed during the Events of 6 October.
 Catalan Republic (2017), a proposed state declared after the 2017 Catalan independence referendum, and immediately suspended.